Lieutenant General Qasem Soleimani Expressway, formerly called Resalat Expressway, is an east-west expressway in Tehran, Iran.

It joins the eastern localities of Tehran metropolis, including Resalat District, to Seyed Khandan in north-central Tehran and further to western parts of the Greater Tehran.

The Resalat Tunnel was opened by Mahmoud Ahmadinejad with newlyweds being the first to drive through it. Upon praying in the tunnel at its re-opening, Rageh Omaar of the BBC prayed on the same prayer mat as Ahmadinejad at the same time.

The expressway was renamed to Shahid Sardar Qasem Soleimani Expressway, following the Assassination of Qasem Soleimani by an American airstrike.

References

Expressways in Tehran
Qasem Soleimani